Robert Maxwell (1923–1991) was a British media proprietor and Member of Parliament.

Robert (or Bob) Maxwell may also refer to:

Politicians 
Robert Maxwell, 5th Lord Maxwell (1493–1546), Scottish statesman
Robert Maxwell, 1st Earl of Nithsdale (after 1586–1646), Scottish Catholic peer
Robert Maxwell, 1st Earl of Farnham (c. 1720–1779), Irish politician
Robert A. Maxwell (1838–1912), American politician in New York
Robert Maxwell (New Brunswick politician) (1858–1914), Canadian politician in the Legislative Assembly of New Brunswick

Others 
Robert Maxwell (cricketer) (born 1945), New Zealand cricketer
Robert Maxwell (golfer) (1876–1949), Scottish amateur golfer
Robert Maxwell (hurdler) (1902–1985), American Olympic hurdler
Robert Maxwell (producer) (1908–1971), American producer of The Adventures of Superman and Lassie TV shows
Robert Maxwell (songwriter) (1921–2012), American harpist and songwriter
Robert Maxwell (writer) (1696–1766), Scottish writer on agriculture
Robert Maxwell (priest) (died 1622), Irish dean
Robert Maxwell (bishop) (died 1672), Anglican bishop in Ireland
Robert Maxwell (cinematographer) (1923–1978), American cinematographer
Robert Maxwell (footballer), Scottish footballer
Robert D. Maxwell (1920–2019), American World War II Medal of Honor recipient
Robert Earl Maxwell (1924–2010), United States federal judge
Tiny Maxwell (Robert W. Maxwell, 1884–1922), American football player, coach, and official; sports editor; namesake of the Maxwell Football Club and the Maxwell Trophy
Bobby Maxwell (character), fictional character from the 1976 American film The Enforcer
Bob Maxwell (Coronation Street), fictional character in the British soap opera